Baillé (Gallo: Balhae) is a former commune in the Ille-et-Vilaine department in Brittany in northwestern France. On 1 January 2019, it was merged into the commune Saint-Marc-le-Blanc.

Population

Inhabitants of Baillé are called Baillochins in French.

See also
Communes of the Ille-et-Vilaine department

References

External links

Former communes of Ille-et-Vilaine